Sergey Leonidovich Markov ( – June 25, 1918), was an Imperial Russian Army general, and became one of the founders of the Volunteer Army counterrevolutionary force of the White movement in southern Russia during the Russian Civil War which broke out in 1917.

Biography
Sergey Markov was born in Saint Petersburg Guberniya. Markov was a career officer, he graduated from the General Staff Academy, St. Petersburg in 1904 and fought in the Russo-Japanese War and was decorated with Order of St. Vladimir.

Between 1911 and 1914 he taught at the  Academy, renamed to Imperial Nicholas Military Academy.  During the First World War, Markov fought under command of General Denikin and was decorated with Order of St. George for bravery.

After the February Revolution of 1917, Markov was first promoted to the commander of South-Western front, but later dismissed from his post and arrested because of his support for General Lavr Kornilov during the Kornilov Affair. On November 19, 1917, Markov escaped from prison and together with generals Denikin and Kornilov, he raised the Volunteer Army in Don region.

On 25 June 1918, during the Kuban Offensive, Markov was fatally wounded when the Volunteer Army captured Torgovaia.

Reference

See also
 Volunteer Army
 Russian Civil War

1878 births
1918 deaths
People from Saint Petersburg Governorate
Imperial Russian Army generals
Russian anti-communists
Russian military personnel killed in action
Russian military personnel of the Russo-Japanese War
Russian military personnel of World War I
Prisoners and detainees of Russia
Escapees from Russian detention
Russian escapees
People of the Russian Civil War
White movement generals
Russian monarchists
Recipients of the Order of Saint Stanislaus (Russian)